
Year 358 BC was a year of the pre-Julian Roman calendar. At the time, it was known as the Year of the Consulship of Ambustus and Proculus (or, less frequently, year 396 Ab urbe condita). The denomination 358 BC for this year has been used since the early medieval period, when the Anno Domini calendar era became the prevalent method in Europe for naming years.

Events 
 By place 
 Persian Empire 
 Artaxerxes III ("Ochus") succeeds Artaxerxes II as King of Persia and restores central authority over the Persian empire's satraps. To secure his throne he puts to death most of his relatives. 

 Greece 
 Alexander of Pherae, Despot of Pherae in Thessaly is murdered by his wife's brother at her instigation.
 Cersobleptes, in conjunction with his brothers, Amadocus II and Berisades, inherits the dominions of the Thracian king, Cotys I, following his murder. However, the overall management of Thracian affairs is assumed by the Euboean adventurer, Charidemus, who is connected by marriage with the royal family, and who plays the prominent part in the ensuing negotiations with Athens for the possession of the Thracian Chersonese.

 Macedonia 
 Philip II of Macedonia invades the hill tribes of Paeonia and decisively beats them.

 Roman Republic 
 The Romans defeat the Volsci, annex most of their territory, and settle it with Roman colonists.  The Romans also force the Latin League to renew its close alliance with Rome, an alliance which was weakened by Rome’s defeat at the hands of the Gauls in 390 BC.

Births 
 Seleucus I Nicator, Macedonian officer of Alexander the Great and founder of the Seleucid dynasty (d. 281 BC)

Deaths 
 Artaxerxes II, King of Persia (b. c. 436 BC)
 Alexander of Pherae, Despot of Pherae in Thessaly, Greece
 Bardyllis, Illyrian king (killed in battle by Phillip of Macedon) (b. c. 448 BC)
 Cotys I, King of Thrace

References